All of Us is the debut extended play by American girl group June's Diary. It is their first original release after appearing on the BET docs-series Chasing Destiny. The EP was released on June 30, 2018 through the independent label Music of Sound. Lyrically, the extended play discusses themes of female empowerment, heartbreak and love. The EP also features guest appearances from American rapper Trina as well as R&B singer Jussie Smollett.

Background 
After the completion of Chasing Destiny, it was announced that the group would be releasing an album through Epic Records.

Commercial performance 
All of Us charted at number eighteen on the Billboard Heatseekers, giving the group their first ever chart entry on Billboard.

Track listing

Charts

Release history

References 

2018 debut EPs
Contemporary R&B EPs
EPs by American artists